Murali Vijay (born 1 April 1984) is a former Indian international cricketer who plays as a right-handed opening batsman. He was a regular member of the Indian Test team until 2018 and plays for Tamil Nadu in domestic first-class cricket.

After failing in his 12th class exam and having started playing cricket at the age of 17, Vijay played club cricket in Chennai before he was selected in the Tamil Nadu Under-22 team. He quickly came up the ranks and made his first-class debut for the Tamil Nadu senior team in 2006. He was one of the top run-scorers of the 2006-07 Ranji Trophy, which was his maiden first-class tournament. By October 2008, he went on to represent South Zone, India Red and India A, and in November 2008, he was handed his Test debut after the team's regular opener Gautam Gambhir was banned for one match by the ICC.

On 30th January 2023, Vijay announced retirement from all forms of international cricket.

Early career
Vijay was born in Madras, Tamil Nadu. He started his cricket at the age of 17. He first played club cricket in Chennai representing Alwarpet in 2003. He was then selected in the Tamil Nadu Under-22 squad for the 2004-05 CK Nayudu Trophy. Tamil Nadu Under-22 won the tournament, but, opening the innings, Vijay averaged just 26.45 in 6 matches. He continued to play club cricket in 2005, before getting selected again in the Tamil Nadu Under-22 squad for the 2005-06 CK Nayudu Trophy. He failed to impress once again, averaging 26.50 in 3 matches.

Despite his below-average performances in club cricket and Under-22 tournaments, Vijay was selected in the Tamil Nadu squad for the Ranji One-day Trophy in February 2006. He made his senior cricket debut in Tamil Nadu's last group fixture of the tournament, against Karnataka on 16 February, and scored 17 in that match. He scored 38 in the quarterfinal against Railways who won the match by one run.

Vijay rose to prominence during the 2006-07 Ranji Trophy, his debut first-class season, in which he finished as the third highest run-getter of the tournament, only behind Karnataka's Robin Uthappa and Bengal's Manoj Tiwary. At the start of this tournament, he made his first-class debut against Delhi and scored a fifty in his debut innings. He accumulated a total of 628 runs at an average of more than 52, including two hundreds and one fifty. He continued his good form in the 2006-07 Ranji One-day Trophy by scoring 277 runs in 7 matches at an average of 39.57 and a high-score of 112.

Vijay played in all seven matches of Tamil Nadu in the 2007-08 Ranji Trophy and scored 582 runs at an average of 58.2 with two hundreds including a high-score of 230* against Saurashtra. After the conclusion of Ranji Trophy, he was selected in the South Zone squad for 2007-08 Duleep Trophy. He batted at 3 in the first match against North Zone and scored a duck and 39. In the second game against East Zone, batting at 3 in the first innings, he scored 46, and registered another duck in the second innings while opening the batting. In the Vijay Hazare Trophy (earlier called Ranji One-day Trophy) that followed, Vijay played seven matches in which he opened the innings thrice and batted at 3 on four occasions. He found success batting at 3, making back-to-back hundreds against Hyderabad and Andhra.

In September 2008, Vijay was picked in the India A team to play against the touring New Zealand A team in two 4-day matches. He carried on his good form and made 45 and 59 in the first match, batting at 3, helping India A win by 129 runs. He opened the innings and scored 98 and 0 in the second match, in which New Zealand A secured victory. In October 2008, Vijay was named in the India Red team for the Challenger Trophy. He played as an opener and finished second among highest run-scorers of the tournament with 164 runs from 3 matches at an average of 54.66.

Test career
Vijay made his Test debut against Australia in the Fourth and final Test of the Border-Gavaskar Trophy, in Nagpur, in November 2008. He was selected for the match after Gautam Gambhir received a one-Test ban for elbowing Shane Watson in the Third Test of the same series in Feroz Shah Kotla in Delhi. Vijay was participating in a Ranji trophy match at the time, and made his Test debut on the final day of that match.

Of Vijay's technique, former Australian captain Allan Border said "His defensive shots are so assured. And he looks comfortable of both front and back foot. And when he attacks, he doesn't go hard at the deliveries. I can see why this young man is playing".

Vijay partnered Virender Sehwag, and they got India off to a solid start in both innings. Vijay made 33 and 41, contributing to opening stands of 98 and 116. During Australia's first innings, Vijay caused the first wicket to fall, running out Matthew Hayden with a direct hit from mid on. Hayden was attempting a quick single. He then ran out Michael Hussey when fielding at silly point. Hussey was unaware that Vijay had intercepted the ball at close range and instinctively took a step out of his crease in anticipation of a run, by which time Vijay threw down the stumps. In the second innings, he caught Brett Lee at bat pad from the bowling of Harbhajan Singh to complete his first catch.

Following his performance in his debut Test, Vijay was selected for the Indian ODI squad for the first three matches against the touring England team. He did not get to play, and was dropped after the first three matches upon the return of senior batsman Sachin Tendulkar from a break.

In December 2009, Vijay was given another opportunity in the Test team when Gambhir withdrew from the Third and final Test against Sri Lanka at Brabourne Stadium in Mumbai in order to attend his sister's wedding. Vijay took two catches at bat pad from Harbhajan in Sri Lanka's first innings. When India replied, he put on 221 for the first wicket with Sehwag, but was out for 87 in sight of his maiden Test century. The Indians went on to complete an innings victory, and become the number 1 Test team.

Vijay was taken on the tour of Bangladesh in January 2010 as the reserve batsman, and he was called into the team after V. V. S. Laxman injured a finger in the First Test. Vijay played in the Second Test in Mirpur in Laxman's No. 5 position, scoring 30. In the same match, No. 3 batsman Rahul Dravid was injured after being hit under the jaw by a bouncer, so Vijay then played in Dravid's position in the two-Test home series against South Africa.

He was later selected as the reserve opener for away series against Sri Lanka in August 2010 and the home series against Australia in October 2010. He played in the Second and Third Tests against Sri Lanka after Gambhir was injured. He got another opportunity when Gambhir, was injured in the first match against Australia and was ruled out of Second Test. Vijay scored 139 runs in the first innings, his maiden Test century, featuring in a triple century partnership with Sachin Tendulkar. Vijay and debutant Cheteshwar Pujara added 72 runs crucial partnership which helped India complete a 2–0 series win.

Though he was dropped from the national squad, however he was brought back in the 2013 home series against Australia replacing out-of-form Gautam Gambhir. Though Vijay failed in the first test, he scored an assured and well paced 167 in the second Test and put on a 370-run record second wicket partnership with Cheteshwar Pujara (204). In the third test at Mohali, he scored his second consecutive 150+ score (153) with a strong opening stand of 289 with debutant Shikhar Dhawan, who scored a whopping 187 off just 174 balls. And then added on 92 runs for the third wicket with Sachin Tendulkar (37). He had an amazing series against Australia and was the highest scorer with 430 runs including two centuries both which were 150+ and an amazing half century.

 Vijay scored his first Test century outside India on in July 2014 at Trent Bridge against England. He finished as the leading run scorer for India in the series with 402 runs from five matches.

When India toured Australia later in the same year, Vijay scored a patient and a steady 99 at the Adelaide Oval putting up a partnership of 185 with his skipper Virat Kohli to almost take India to an improbable victory, chasing 364 in the fourth innings. His dismissal triggered the batting collapse and India lost the test by a close margin. Vijay was at his fluent best in the second test at the Gabba, Brisbane. He scored 144 at a brisk pace to take India to a position of strength on the first day. This equaled the highest score by an Indian at the ground.

He scored his sixth Test hundred in the one-match Test series against Bangladesh in June 2015.

ODI career
Vijay debuted in ODIs against South Africa in the third and final one dayer on 27 Feb 2010. He scored a brisk 25 runs off 16 balls.

He started a full series during a tri-nations tournament in Zimbabwe when India rested most of the first-choice team. Vijay performed poorly and was dropped for India's fourth match as they came last behind Zimbabwe.

Vijay was selected for New Zealand 5 ODI series 2010 and he played first 3 ODI in which he scored an average of 30. Later, he was replaced by wicketkeeper Parthiv Patel for other 2 ODI matches.

International T20 career
Vijay was selected for 2010 ICC World Twenty20. He fared poorly in India's disastrous campaign averaging just below 15 and failing to provide good starts in all the matches.

Indian Premier League career
Vijay played in the Indian Premier League for his home town franchise, Chennai Super Kings until the sixth season of the competition before moving to Delhi Daredevils. In April 2016, he was named captain of Kings XI Punjab replacing South African David Miller in the middle of the season. He missed out the entire 2017 season due to wrist surgery.

Personal life
Vijay is married to Nikita Vanjara who was earlier married to Dinesh Karthik, but later got divorced. The couple have two sons and one daughter.

References

External links

 

1984 births
Indian cricketers
India Test cricketers
India One Day International cricketers
India Twenty20 International cricketers
Central Districts cricketers
Tamil Nadu cricketers
Living people
Chennai Super Kings cricketers
South Zone cricketers
India Blue cricketers
India Green cricketers
India Red cricketers
Punjab Kings cricketers
Delhi Capitals cricketers
Essex cricketers
Somerset cricketers